Cirolana is a genus of isopod crustaceans.

Names

Some of the species are named for people, as C. brucei for zoologist Niel L. Bruce, who has named many isopods; C. mercuryi for musician Freddie Mercury; C. cranchii for explorer John Cranch, a friend and employee of William Elford Leach who first described the genus in 1818. The generic name Cirolana is an anagram of Carolina, named for an unknown woman called Caroline. Leach named a number of isopod genera with anagrams of Caroline or Carolina. In the French work in which Leach proposed these names he gave each new genus a French name as well as a Latin zoological name.  Sometimes - as with Cirolana - it was the French name that was the anagram of Caroline; in this case 'Cirolane'.

Species

Cirolana includes the following species:

Subgenus Cirolana (Anopsilana) Leach, 1818
Cirolana acanthura (Notenboom, 1981)
Cirolana aleci (Brusca, Wetzer & France, 1995)
Cirolana barnardi (Bruce, 1992)
Cirolana browni (Van Name, 1936)
Cirolana conditoria (Bruce & Iliffe, 1993)
Cirolana crenata (Bowman & Franz, 1982)
Cirolana cubensis (Hay, 1903)
Cirolana hirsuta (Yasmeen, 2005)
Cirolana jonesi (Kensley, 1987)
Cirolana lingua (Bowman & Iliffe, 1987)
Cirolana luciae (Barnard, 1940)
Cirolana magna (Ortiz, Lalana & Perez, 1997)
Cirolana marosina Botosaneanu, 2003
Cirolana oaxaca (Carvacho & Haasmann, 1984)
Cirolana pleocissa (Botosaneanu & Iliffe, 1997)
Cirolana poissoni (Paulian & Delamare Deboutteville, 1956)
Cirolana pustulosa (Hale, 1925)
Cirolana radicicola (Notenboom, 1981)
Cirolana sinu (Kensley & Schotte, 1994)
Cirolana willeyi (Stebbing, 1904)

(main genus)
Cirolana albida Richardson, 1901
Cirolana albidoida Kensley & Schotte, 1987
Cirolana aldabrensis Schotte & Kensley, 2005
Cirolana arafurae Bruce, 1986
Cirolana australiense Hale, 1925
Cirolana australis Keable, 2001
Cirolana avida Nunomura, 1988
Cirolana bougaardti Kensley, 1984
Cirolana bovina Barnard, 1940
Cirolana brocha Bruce, 1986
Cirolana brucei Javed & Yasmeen, 1995
Cirolana bruscai Bruce & Olesen, 2002
Cirolana canaliculata Tattersall, 1921
Cirolana capricornica Bruce, 1986
Cirolana carina Jones, 1976
Cirolana carinata Yu & Li, 2001
Cirolana chalotiBouvier, 1901
Cirolana cingulata Barnard, 1920
Cirolana comata Keable, 2001
Cirolana cooma Bruce, 1986
Cirolana coronata Bruce & Jones, 1981
Cirolana corrugis Jones, 1976
Cirolana cranchii Leach, 1818
Cirolana crenulitelson Kensley & Schotte, 1987
Cirolana cristata Bruce, 1994
Cirolana curtensis Bruce, 1986
Cirolana diminuta Menzies, 1962
Cirolana dissimilis Keable, 2001
Cirolana enigma Wieder & Feldmann, 1992 †
Cirolana epimerias Richardson, 1910
Cirolana erodiae Bruce, 1986
Cirolana fabianii de Angeli & Rossi, 2006 †
Cirolana fernandezmileraiOrtiz, Lalana &Varela, 2007
Cirolana ferruginosa Risso, 1826
Cirolana fluviatilis Stebbing, 1902
Cirolana furcata Bruce, 1981
Cirolana garuwa Bruce, 1986
Cirolana glebula Bruce, 1994
Cirolana grumula Bruce, 1994
Cirolana halei Bruce, 1981
Cirolana harfordi (Lockington, 1877)
Cirolana hesperia Bruce, 1986
Cirolana imposita Barnard, 1955
Cirolana improceros Bruce, 1986
Cirolana incisicauda Barnard, 1940
Cirolana indica Nierstrasz, 1931
Cirolana kendi Bruce, 1986
Cirolana kiliani Müller, 1993
Cirolana kokoru Bruce, 2004
Cirolana kombona Bruce, 1986
Cirolana lata Haswell, 1882
Cirolana leptanga Bruce, 1994
Cirolana lignicola Nunomura, 1984
Cirolana littoralis Barnard, 1920
Cirolana magdalaina Bruce, 1980
Cirolana makikihi Feldmann, Schweitzer, Maxwell & Kelley, 2008 †
Cirolana manorae Bruce & Javed, 1987
Cirolana mascarensis Müller, 1991
Cirolana mclaughlinae Bruce & Brandt, 2006
Cirolana meinerti Barnard, 1920
Cirolana mekista Bruce, 1986
Cirolana mercuryi Bruce, 2004
Cirolana meseda Hobbins & Jones, 1993
Cirolana mimulus Schotte & Kensley, 2005
Cirolana minuta Hansen, 1890
Cirolana morilla Bruce, 1986
Cirolana namelessensis Brusca, Wetzer & France, 1995
Cirolana nielbrucei Brusca, Wetzer & France, 1995
Cirolana oreonota Bruce, 1986
Cirolana palifrons Barnard, 1920
Cirolana paraerodiae Müller & Salvat, 1993
Cirolana parva Hansen, 1890
Cirolana perlata Barnard, 1936
Cirolana pilosa Yu & Li, 2001
Cirolana pleonastica Stebbing, 1900
Cirolana portula Bruce, 1986
Cirolana quechso Bruce, 2004
Cirolana rachanoi Bruce & Olesen, 2002
Cirolana repigrata Bruce, 1994
Cirolana rugicauda Heller, 1861
Cirolana sadoensis Nunomura, 1981
Cirolana saldanhae Barnard, 1951
Cirolana similis Bruce, 1981
Cirolana solitaria Bruce, 1986
Cirolana somalia Schotte & Kensley, 2005
Cirolana songkhla Rodcharoen, Bruce & Pholpunthin, 2014
Cirolana stenoura Bruce, 1986
Cirolana sulcata Hansen, 1890
Cirolana sulcaticauda Stebbing, 1904
Cirolana tarahomii Khalaji-Pirbalouty & Wägele, 2011
Cirolana theleceps Barnard, 1940
Cirolana transcostata Barnard, 1959
Cirolana triloba Bruce, 1981
Cirolana troglexuma Botosaneanu & Iliffe, 1997
Cirolana tuberculata (Richardson, 1910)
Cirolana tuberculosa Bruce, 1986
Cirolana tumulosa Holdich, Harrison & Bruce, 1981
Cirolana undata Schotte & Kensley, 2005
Cirolana undulata Barnard, 1914
Cirolana vanhoeffeni Nierstrasz, 1931
Cirolana venusticauda Stebbing, 1902
Cirolana vicina Barnard, 1914
Cirolana victoriae Bruce, 1981
Cirolana wongat Bruce, 1994
Cirolana yucatana Botosaneanu & Iliffe, 2000
Cirolana yunca (Botosaneanu & Iliffe, 2000)

References

Cymothoida
Isopod genera
Taxa named by William Elford Leach